Jonas Platt (June 30, 1769 – February 22, 1834) was an American lawyer and politician from New York. He was a member of the United States House of Representatives.

Early life
Platt was born on June 30, 1769, in Poughkeepsie, Province of New York, in what was then British America.  He was the son of politician and lawyer Zephaniah Platt (1735–1807), who founded Plattsburgh, New York, and his second wife, Mary Van Wyck Platt (1742–1809). Among his siblings was New York State Treasurer Charles Z. Platt.

He attended a French Academy at Montreal, Quebec, studied law, and was admitted to the bar in 1790.

Career
He practiced law in Poughkeepsie and served as the county clerk of Herkimer County, New York, from 1791 to 1798. He was also the county clerk of Oneida County, New York, from 1798 to 1802. He was a member of the New York State Assembly in 1796.

Platt was elected as a Federalist to the Sixth Congress, and served from March 4, 1799, to March 3, 1801. He was the chairman of the United States House Committee on Revisal and Unfinished Business. Afterward, he resumed the practice of law and served as a general in the Cavalry in the New York State Militia. In 1810, he was an unsuccessful candidate for governor. He was a member of the New York State Senate from 1809 to 1813.  He was also a member of the Council of Appointment in 1813.

From 1814 to 1821, Platt was an associate justice of the New York Supreme Court. He was a delegate to the New York Constitutional Convention in 1821.

Personal life
He married Helena Livingston (1767–1859), the daughter of Dr. Henry Livingston and Susannah Storm (née Conklin) Livingston, of the Livingston family.  She was also the sister of Continental Congressman Gilbert Livingston, the Rev. Dr. John Henry Livingston, president of Queen's College, and author Henry Livingston Jr. (the grandfather of U.S. Senator Sidney Breese and Admiral Samuel Livingston Breese), among others. Together, Jonas and Helena were the parents of eight children, including:

 Susan Jonasse Platt (1793–1843), who married Richard Ray Lansing (d. 1855).
 Zephaniah Platt (1796–1871), the Michigan Attorney General.
 Helen Livingston Platt (1798–1876), who married Truman Parmelee (1801–1845). After his death, she married Dr. Henry W. Bell.

Platt died on February 22, 1834, in Peru, Clinton County, New York.  He was buried at the Riverside Cemetery in Plattsburgh.

References

External links
 
 
 Livingston family tree

|-

1769 births
1834 deaths
Members of the New York State Assembly
New York (state) state senators
Politicians from Poughkeepsie, New York
People from Herkimer County, New York
New York Supreme Court Justices
Livingston family
Federalist Party members of the United States House of Representatives from New York (state)
18th-century American politicians
19th-century American politicians
19th-century American judges